Whauphill (NX 40462 49887) was a railway station on the Wigtownshire Railway branch line, from Newton Stewart to Whithorn, of the Portpatrick and Wigtownshire Joint Railway. It served a rural area in Wigtownshire. Whauphill is a small rural village with Wigtown situated some 5 miles east of the village.

History
The Portpatrick and Wigtownshire Joint Railway was formed from the amalgamation of two railway companies: The Portpatrick Railway and the Wigtownshire Railway, which got into financial difficulties; they merged and were taken over.

A station master's house was provided. In the 1880s Whauphill had a post and telegraph office. The station had a passing loop, a signal box located on the platform, and a goods shed.

Other stations 
 Newton Stewart - junction
 Causewayend
 Wigtown
 Kirkinner
 Sorbie
 Millisle
 Garlieston
 Broughton Skeog
 Whithorn

See also
 List of closed railway stations in Britain

References 
Notes

Sources
 
 Casserley, H.C.(1968). Britain's Joint Lines. Shepperton: Ian Allan. .

External links
 Disused stations
 Whauphill station
 RailScot

Disused railway stations in Dumfries and Galloway
Former Portpatrick and Wigtownshire Joint Railway stations
Railway stations in Great Britain opened in 1875
Railway stations in Great Britain closed in 1950